Gambueh-ye Bozorg (also Romanized as Gambū‘eh-ye Bozorg and Gombooehé Bozorg; also known as Gambū‘eh, Gonbū‘eh-ye Bozorg, and Qombū‘eh-ye Bozorg) is a village in Jahad Rural District, Hamidiyeh District, Ahvaz County, Khuzestan Province, Iran. At the 2006 census, its population was 1,846, in 312 families.

References 

Populated places in Ahvaz County